The following is an alphabetical list of articles related to the U.S. state of Alabama.

0–9 

.al.us – Internet second-level domain for the state of Alabama
22nd state to join the United States of America
31st parallel north
32nd parallel north
33rd parallel north
34th parallel north
35th parallel north
85th meridian west
87th meridian west
88th meridian west

A
Abortion in Alabama
Adams-Onís Treaty of 1819
Adjacent states:

Agriculture in Alabama
Airports in Alabama
AL – United States Postal Service postal code for the state of Alabama
Alabama  website
:Category:Alabama
commons:Category:Alabama
commons:Category:Maps of Alabama
Alabama Academy of Honor
Alabama Clean Water Partnership
Alabama Cooperative Extension System
Alabama Highway Patrol
Alabama in the American Civil War, 1861–1865
Alabama Jubilee Hot Air Balloon Classic
Alabama real estate bubble of the 1810s
Alabama Shakespeare Festival
Alabama Sports Festival
Alabama State Capitol
Alabama Symphony Orchestra
The Alabama Theatre
Alys Robinson Stephens Performing Arts Center (Home of the Alabama Symphony Orchestra), Birmingham
American Village, Montevallo
Amusement parks in Alabama
Arboreta in Alabama
commons:Category:Arboreta in Alabama
Archaeology in Alabama
:Category:Archaeological sites in Alabama
commons:Category:Archaeological sites in Alabama
Architecture in Alabama
Area codes in Alabama
Art museums and galleries in Alabama
commons:Category:Art museums and galleries in Alabama
Astronomical observatories in Alabama
commons:Category:Astronomical observatories in Alabama
Attorney General of the State of Alabama

B
Battle of Athens (1864)
Battle of Cherokee Station
Battle of Columbus (1865)
Battle of Day's Gap
Battle of Decatur
Battle of Ebenezer Church
Battle of Fort Blakeley
Battle of Mobile Bay
Battle of Munford
Battle of Newtown
Battle of Selma
Battle of Spanish Fort
Battle of Sulphur Creek Trestle
Bayfest, Mobile's Music Festival
Ben E. May, Mobile philanthropist 
Big Spring Jam
Birmingham, Alabama
Birmingham Jefferson Convention Complex, Birmingham
Birmingham Astronomical Society
Birmingham Civil Rights Institute
Birmingham Museum of Art
Birmingham riot of 1963
Black Belt
Bloody Tuesday (1964)
Botanical gardens in Alabama
commons:Category:Botanical gardens in Alabama
Bryant–Denny Stadium, Tuscaloosa
Buildings and structures in Alabama
commons:Category:Buildings in Alabama

C

Cahawba, Alabama, state capital 1820-1826
Cannabis in Alabama
Capital of the State of Alabama
Capital punishment in Alabama
Capitol of the State of Alabama
commons:Category:Alabama State Capitol
Caves of Alabama
commons:Category:Caves of Alabama
Celebration Arena, Priceville
Census statistical areas of Alabama
Cities in Alabama
Nicknames of Alabama cities
:Category:Cities in Alabama
commons:Category:Cities in Alabama
City Stages Music Festival, Birmingham
Climate of Alabama
Climate change in Alabama 
Coat of arms of the state of Alabama
Colleges and universities in Alabama
Colony of Georgia, 1732–1776
commons:Category:Universities and colleges in Alabama
Colony of West Florida, 1763–1783
Communications in Alabama
commons:Category:Communications in Alabama
Companies in Alabama
:Category:Companies based in Alabama
Congressional districts of Alabama
Constitution of the State of Alabama
Convention centers in Alabama
commons:Category:Convention centers in Alabama
Counties of the state of Alabama
commons:Category:Counties in Alabama
Crime in Alabama
Culture of Alabama
commons:Category:Alabama culture

D
Demographics of Alabama
:Category:Demographics of Alabama

E
Economy of Alabama
:Category:Economy of Alabama
commons:Category:Economy of Alabama
Education in Alabama
:Category:Education in Alabama
commons:Category:Education in Alabama
Elections of the state of Alabama
commons:Category:Alabama elections
Environment of Alabama
commons:Category:Environment of Alabama

F

Fair Park Arena, Birmingham
Festivals in Alabama
commons:Category:Festivals in Alabama
Flag of the state of Alabama
Florida Occidental, 1783–1821
Forts in Alabama
:Category:Forts in Alabama
commons:Category:Forts in Alabama

G

Geography of Alabama
:Category:Geography of Alabama
commons:Category:Geography of Alabama
Geology of Alabama
:Category:Geology of Alabama
commons:Category:Geology of Alabama
Ghost towns in Alabama
:Category:Ghost towns in Alabama
commons:Category:Ghost towns in Alabama
GMAC Bowl
Golf clubs and courses in Alabama
Government of the state of Alabama  website
:Category:Government of Alabama
commons:Category:Government of Alabama
Governors Drive
Governor of the State of Alabama
List of governors of Alabama
Great Seal of the State of Alabama
Gulf Shores, Alabama
Gun laws in Alabama

H
Hank Aaron Stadium, Mobile
Hatton-Brown Publishers
Heritage railroads in Alabama
commons:Category:Heritage railroads in Alabama
High schools of Alabama
Higher education in Alabama
Highway Patrol of Alabama
Highways in Alabama
Hiking trails in Alabama
commons:Category:Hiking trails in Alabama
Historical Panorama of Alabama Agriculture
History of Alabama
Historical outline of Alabama
History of Baptists in Alabama
:Category:History of Alabama
commons:Category:History of Alabama
History of slavery in Alabama
Hospitals in Alabama
House of Representatives of the State of Alabama
Huntsville, Alabama, first state capital 1819-1820

I
Images of Alabama
commons:Category:Alabama
The International Motorsports Hall of Fame & Museum, Talladega
Islands of Alabama

J
Joe W. Davis Stadium, Huntsville
Jordan–Hare Stadium, Auburn
Jubilee City Fest, Montgomery

K
 Kent, Elmore County, Alabama
 Kent, Pike County, Alabama

L
La Florida, 1565–1763
Ladd–Peebles Stadium, Mobile
Lakes in Alabama
:Category:Lakes of Alabama
commons:Category:Lakes of Alabama
Landmarks in Alabama
commons:Category:Landmarks in Alabama
Legion Field, Birmingham
LGBT rights in Alabama
Lieutenant Governor of the State of Alabama
Lists related to the state of Alabama:
List of airports in Alabama
List of amphibians of Alabama
List of census statistical areas in Alabama
List of cities in Alabama
List of city nicknames in Alabama
List of colleges and universities in Alabama
List of companies in Alabama
List of counties in Alabama
List of forts in Alabama
List of ghost towns in Alabama
List of governors of Alabama
List of high schools in Alabama
List of highway routes in Alabama
List of hospitals in Alabama
List of individuals executed in Alabama
List of islands of Alabama
List of lakes of Alabama
List of law enforcement agencies in Alabama
List of lieutenant governors of Alabama
List of mammals of Alabama
List of museums in Alabama
List of National Historic Landmarks in Alabama
List of newspapers in Alabama
List of the oldest buildings in Alabama
List of people from Alabama
List of places in Alabama
List of radio stations in Alabama
List of railroads in Alabama
List of Registered Historic Places in Alabama
List of reptiles of Alabama
List of rivers in Alabama
List of school districts in Alabama
List of state forests in Alabama
List of state highways in Alabama
List of state parks in Alabama
List of state prisons in Alabama
List of state symbols of Alabama
List of telephone area codes in Alabama
List of television stations in Alabama
List of United States congressional delegations from Alabama
List of United States congressional districts in Alabama
List of United States representatives from Alabama
List of United States senators from Alabama

M
Maps of Alabama
commons:Category:Maps of Alabama
Mardi Gras, Mobile
Mass media in Alabama
Ben E. May, Mobile philanthropist 
McWane Science Center, Birmingham
Mitchell Center, Mobile
Mobile, Alabama
Mobile, Alabama in the American Civil War
Mobile Bay Jubilee
Mobile campaign (1865)
Mobile Civic Center, Mobile
Mobile District, 1810–1821
Montgomery, Alabama, state capital since 1846, CSA capital 1861
Montgomery bus boycott
Montgomery Riverwalk Stadium, Montgomery
Monuments and memorials in Alabama
commons:Category:Monuments and memorials in Alabama
Mountains of Alabama
commons:Category:Mountains of Alabama
Movie Gallery Veterans Stadium, Troy
Museums in Alabama
:Category:Museums in Alabama
commons:Category:Museums in Alabama
Music of Alabama
:Category:Music of Alabama
commons:Category:Music of Alabama
:Category:Musical groups from Alabama
:Category:Musicians from Alabama

N
National Forests of Alabama
commons:Category:National Forests of Alabama
National historic landmarks of Alabama
commons:Category:National Historic Landmarks in Alabama
National Peanut Festival
Natural history of Alabama
commons:Category:Natural history of Alabama
Nature centers in Alabama
commons:Category:Nature centers in Alabama
Newspapers of Alabama

O
Old Saint Stephens
Old State Bank
Outdoor sculptures in Alabama
commons:Category:Outdoor sculptures in Alabama

P
Papajohns.com Bowl (formerly the Birmingham Bowl)
Paul Snow Stadium, Jacksonville
People from Alabama
:Category:People from Alabama
commons:Category:People from Alabama
:Category:People by city in Alabama
:Category:People by county in Alabama
:Category:People from Alabama by occupation
Places in Alabama
Point Mallard Aquatic Center, Decatur
Politics of Alabama
:Category:Politics of Alabama
commons:Category:Politics of Alabama
Portal:Alabama
Protected areas of Alabama
commons:Category:Protected areas of Alabama
Province of Georgia

Q
Quad site

R
Radio stations in Alabama
Railroad museums in Alabama
commons:Category:Railroad museums in Alabama
Railroads in Alabama
Regions Charity Classic (formerly the Bruno's Memorial Classic)
Regions Park, Hoover
Registered historic places in Alabama
commons:Category:Registered Historic Places in Alabama
Religion in Alabama
:Category:Religion in Alabama
commons:Category:Religion in Alabama
Republic of West Florida, 1810
Rhea-McEntire House
Rickwood Field, Birmingham
Rivers of Alabama
commons:Category:Rivers of Alabama
Robert Trent Jones Golf Trail

S
Stand in the Schoolhouse Door
St. Stephens, Alabama, territorial capital 1817-1819
School districts of Alabama
Scouting in Alabama
Selma, Alabama
Selma, Alabama in the American Civil War
Selma to Montgomery marches
Senate of the State of Alabama
Senior Bowl
Settlements in Alabama
Cities in Alabama
Towns in Alabama
Census Designated Places in Alabama
Other unincorporated communities in Alabama
List of ghost towns in Alabama
List of places in Alabama
Sidewalk Moving Picture Festival
Skirmish at Paint Rock Bridge
Spirit of America Festival
Sports in Alabama
commons:Category:Sports in Alabama
Sports venues in Alabama
commons:Category:Sports venues in Alabama
State Capitol of Alabama
State of Alabama  website
Constitution of the State of Alabama
Government of the state of Alabama
:Category:Government of Alabama
commons:Category:Government of Alabama
Executive branch of the government of the state of Alabama
Governor of the State of Alabama
Legislative branch of the government of the state of Alabama
Legislature of the State of Alabama
Senate of the State of Alabama
House of Representatives of the State of Alabama
Judicial branch of the government of the state of Alabama
Supreme Court of the State of Alabama
State of Georgia, western claims 1776-1802
State parks of Alabama
commons:Category:State parks of Alabama
State police of Alabama
State prisons of Alabama
Structures in Alabama
commons:Category:Buildings and structures in Alabama
Superfund sites in Alabama
Supreme Court of the State of Alabama
Symbols of the state of Alabama
:Category:Symbols of Alabama
commons:Category:Symbols of Alabama

T
Talladega Superspeedway
Telecommunications in Alabama
commons:Category:Communications in Alabama
Telephone area codes in Alabama
Television stations in Alabama
Tennessee River
Tennessee Valley Authority
Territory of Alabama, 1817–1819
Territory of Mississippi, 1798–1817
Theatres in Alabama
commons:Category:Theatres in Alabama
Tourism in Alabama  website
commons:Category:Tourism in Alabama
Trail of Tears, 1830–1838
Treaty of Madrid of 1795
Transportation in Alabama
:Category:Transportation in Alabama
commons:Category:Transport in Alabama
Tuscaloosa, Alabama, state capital 1826-1846

U
United States of America
States of the United States of America
United States census statistical areas of Alabama
United States congressional delegations from Alabama
United States congressional districts in Alabama
United States Court of Appeals for the Eleventh Circuit
United States District Court for the Middle District of Alabama
United States District Court for the Northern District of Alabama
United States District Court for the Southern District of Alabama
United States representatives from Alabama
United States senators from Alabama
Universities and colleges in Alabama
commons:Category:Universities and colleges in Alabama
U.S. Space and Rocket Center, Huntsville
U.S. Space Camp, Huntsville
US-AL – ISO 3166-2:US region code for the State of Alabama

V
Von Braun Center, Huntsville
Vulcan statue, Birmingham

W
Water parks in Alabama
Waterfalls of Alabama
commons:Category:Waterfalls of Alabama
Wikimedia
Wikimedia Commons:Category:Alabama
commons:Category:Maps of Alabama
Wikinews:Category:Alabama
Wikinews:Portal:Alabama
Wikipedia Category:Alabama
Wikipedia Portal:Alabama
Wikipedia:WikiProject Alabama
:Category:WikiProject Alabama articles
:Category:WikiProject Alabama members

X

Y
 Yellowhammer

Z
Zoos in Alabama

See also

Topic overview:
Alabama
Outline of Alabama

Alabama
 
Indexes of topics by U.S. state